Change is the fourth album by German hard rock group Pink Cream 69, released in 1995. It was the first album with current singer David Readman.

Track listing

Personnel 
 David Readman – vocals
 Alfred Koffler – guitar
 Dennis Ward – bass guitar
 Kosta Zafiriou – drums
 David A. – keyboards
 Bateke – percussion

Production 
 Mixing – Shay Baby and Eric Greedy
 Engineer – Shay Baby and Bill Cooper
 Assistant Engineer – Matt Westfield

References

External links 
 Heavy Harmonies page

1995 albums
Pink Cream 69 albums
Epic Records albums